S. N. Mehta was a noted Indian politician and Indian independence activist. He was a member of the Indian National Congress party in Madhya Pradesh. He was a member of the Indian Constituent Assembly, the Provisional Parliament and the Rajya Sabha between 1952 and 1960. He became the Chief Minister of Vindhya Pradesh from April 1949 to March 1952.

References

Indian independence activists from Madhya Pradesh
Members of the Constituent Assembly of India
Rajya Sabha members from Madhya Pradesh
Vindhya Pradesh MLAs 1951–1956
Vindhya Pradesh politicians
Indian National Congress politicians
Chief ministers from Indian National Congress
Indian National Congress politicians from Madhya Pradesh